The Dick Schaap Award for Outstanding Journalism was established in 2002 to honor the memory of one of America's pre-eminent sports writers, Dick Schaap. The award is presented by the Nassau County Sports Commission and is given out to the journalist, in any medium, who best exemplifies the principles and talents of Dick Schaap during the past year. The award recipient is determined by confidential balloting of the Dick Schaap Selection Committee, which is composed of respected members of the media, and chaired by Dick's son, ESPN reporter Jeremy Schaap.

Although the recipient need not be a sports journalist, he/she must convey the passion and insight for stories and people he/she covers as Schaap did.

Recipients

 2002 – Jim McKay, ABC Sports
 2003 – Frank Deford, Sports Illustrated
 2004 – Bob Costas, NBC and HBO Sports
 2005 – Dave Anderson, The New York Times
 2006 – Bob Ryan, Boston Globe
 2007 – Lance Williams and Mark Fainaru-Wada, San Francisco Chronicle
 2008 – Mitch Albom, Detroit Free Press
 2009 – no recipient
 2010 – Mary Carillo, NBC and HBO Sports
 2011 – Dave Kindred, Golf Digest and National Sports Journalism Center

External links
 https://web.archive.org/web/20070928185055/http://www.dickschaapaward.org/
 http://www.nassausports.org

American journalism awards
American sports trophies and awards
Sportscasting awards
Sports writing awards